Phyllopachyceras is an extinct genus of ammonoid cephalopods belonging to the  family Phylloceratidae. These nektonic carnivores lived in the Cretaceous, from Hauterivian to Maastrichtian to age.

Species 
 Phyllopachyceras chitianum Imlay, 1960
 Phyllopachyceras infundibulum d'Orbigny, 1841
 Phyllopachyceras reymenti Riccardi, 2018
 Phyllopachyceras trinitense Anderson, 1938
 Phyllopachyceras umpuanum Anderson, 1938

Description 
On the external surface ribs are alternately short and long and sutures show a high complexity, with saddle endings perfectly quadruple (tetraphillic). The section of the shell is quite thick.

Distribution 
Fossils of species within this genus have been found in the Cretaceous of Antarctica, Argentina, Austria, China, France, Hungary, Italy, Japan, Madagascar, New Zealand, Poland, Russia, Spain, Ukraine and United States.

References

Further reading 
 Kazushige Tanabe, Cyprian Kulicki, and Neil H. Landman  Precursory siphuncular membranes in the body chamber of Phyllopachyceras and comparisons with other ammonoids

Cretaceous ammonites
Ammonites of Africa
Cretaceous Africa
Ammonites of Asia
Cretaceous Asia
Ammonites of Europe
Cretaceous Europe
Ammonites of North America
Cretaceous United States
Ammonites of South America
Cretaceous Argentina